CP2 may refer to:

 CP2 (classification), a disability sport classification specific to cerebral palsy
 Ap star, a class of chemically-peculiar stars
 Chicago Pile-2, a later development of CP-1, the World's first artificial nuclear reactor
 Complex projective plane, in mathematics
 Ceruloplasmin, an enzyme
 Child's Play 2, a 1990 American horror film
 Warren CP-2, an experimental biplane
 CP2: an EEG electrode site according to the 10-20 system
 Elias MRT station, MRT station code

See also
 2CP, callsign of ABC South East NSW 
 C2P, artillery tractor
 CP (disambiguation)
 CPP (disambiguation)
 CPCP (disambiguation)